Tuvvi Tuvvi Tuvvi is a 1999 Indian Kannada-language comedy film directed by Singeetam Srinivasa Rao and written by Richard Louis. The film stars Raghavendra Rajkumar and Charulatha. It was released on 5 February 1999.

Plot

Cast 
 Raghavendra Rajkumar as Kumar
 Charulatha as Leena
 Doddanna as Peter Braganza
 Jayanthi as Maria
 C. R. Simha as Mutthappa
 Ramakrishna as Shivu
 Vinaya Prasad as Geetha
 Richard Louis as Kempanna
 M. S. Umesh as Oorukoti
 Mandya Ramesh

Production 
Tuvvi Tuvvi Tuvvi was directed by Singeetam Srinivasa Rao, produced by Parvathamma Rajkumar under Dakshayani Cine Combines, and written by Richard Louis. Cinematography was handled by B. C. Gowrishankar and editing by S. Manohar.

Soundtrack 
The soundtrack was composed by Hamsalekha.

Release and reception 
Tuvvi Tuvvi Tuvvi was released on 5 February 1999. Jyothi Raghuram of The Hindu said, "Tuvvi Tuvvi Tuvvi [...] might not mark the resurrection of Raghavendra Rajkumar, but it certainly is a boost to the Kannada industry for the clean entertainment it provides. The story is different and original. the casting is thoughtful, music is not a letdown; and on this has been built an attractive edifice by veteran Singeetam Srinivasa Rao. What more could one ask for in a day of remakes and "masala" films." S. Shivakumar of The Times of India said, "Tuvvi tuvvi tuvvi is not great cinema but when your nerves have been assaulted from 4 to Z, this film acts as an aspirin."

References

External links 
 

1990s Kannada-language films
1999 comedy films
1999 films
Films directed by Singeetam Srinivasa Rao
Indian comedy films